Stewart Island is an island of the Andaman Islands.  It belongs to the North and Middle Andaman administrative district, part of the Indian union territory of Andaman and Nicobar Islands.
Its population only consists of two people.

Geography
The island belongs to the Stewart Sound Group and lies between dotrel island and Curlew Island.

Administration
Politically, Stewart Island, along neighboring Stewart Sound Group Islands, is part of Diglipur Taluk.

Transportation
Ferry service is available from Mayabunder, on demand.

Demographics 
According to the 2011 census of India, the Island has 1 households. The effective literacy rate (i.e. the literacy rate of population excluding children aged 6 and below) is 100%.

References 

 Geological Survey of India

Cities and towns in North and Middle Andaman district
Islands of North and Middle Andaman district
Populated places in India
Islands of India
Islands of the Bay of Bengal